Hélène Berr (27 March 1921 – 10 April 1945) was a French woman of Jewish ancestry and faith, who documented her life in a diary during the time of Nazi occupation of France. In France she is considered to be a "French Anne Frank".

Life 
Hélène Berr was born in Paris, France, a member of a Jewish family that had lived in France for several generations. She studied Russian and English literature at the Sorbonne university. She also played the violin. 
She was not able to pass her final exam at the university because the anti-Semitic laws of the Vichy regime prevented her from doing so. She was active in the Union générale des israélites de France (UGIF, General Organization of Jews in France). On 8 March 1944 Hélène and her parents were captured and taken to Drancy internment camp and from there were deported  to the Auschwitz concentration camp on 27 March 1944.  In early November 1944  Hélène was transferred to  the Bergen-Belsen concentration camp,  where she died in April 1945 just five days before the liberation of the camp.

Diary 
Hélène Berr began her notes on 7 April 1942 at the age of 21. At first the horrors of anti-Semitism and the war do not show in her diary. The landscape around Paris, her feelings for one young man, Gérard, and her friends at the Sorbonne are the topics of her diary. In addition to her studies, the reading and discussion of literature, and playing and listening to music comprise a significant part of her social and cultural life. She falls in love with Jean Morawiecki, who reciprocates, but ultimately decides he must leave Paris to join the Free French in late November 1942.

In her text, which has many literary citations including William Shakespeare, John Keats and Lewis Carroll, the war initially appears at most as an evil dream. But little by little she becomes more conscious of her situation. She reports about the yellow badge that Jews were ordered to wear and notes the expulsions from public parks, the curfews and arrests, as well as the abuse against her family members and friends.

The actions directed against the Jews become harsher and more painful to all of them, but the Final Solution itself is never made explicit to the public. Because of this, Berr, who does much volunteer work with orphans, initially finds it impossible to comprehend why women and especially children are included in the deportations to the camps. She hears rumours about the gas chambers and complains about her fear of the future: "We live from hour to hour, not even from day to day." A deported Jew tells her about the plans of the Nazis. The last entry in the diary is about a conversation with a former prisoner of war from Germany. The diary ends on 15 February 1944 with a citation from Shakespeare's 'Macbeth': "Horror! Horror! Horror!"

The Diary, written in French, contains some English. It was translated by David Bellos and the entire diary has been translated besides 2 sentences. The first sentence appears on page 48 (of the English copy). "Refait l'Ancien dans la matinée." The meaning of this sentence has not been established. The second sentence that has not been translated was on page 261. "Nous serons de la même fournée." Madame Loewe says this sentence to reassure Hélène. In common tongue, this phrase means, "We'll be in the same boat." Madame Loewe is trying to reassure Hélène that she is not alone and that if they are taken they will be taken together. It was meant to reassure her. However, the literal translation of that sentence is, "We will be in the same oven." To quote David Bellos (the translator), "I cannot reproduce in English the hideous lurch into prophecy made by this phrase in French, and so I have left it alone."

Publication
Berr ordered her notes to be released to her fiancé Jean Morawiecki after her death. Morawiecki later followed a career as a diplomat. In November 1992, Hélène Berr's niece, Mariette Job, decided to track down Morawiecki with a view to publishing the diary.  He gave the diary that consists of 262 single pages to Job in April 1994. The diary has been stored at Paris' Mémorial de la Shoah (Holocaust Memorial Museum) since 2002.

The book was published in France in January 2008. The Libération paper declared it as "the editorial event at the beginning of 2008"  and reminded the readers of the lively discussions about the book of Jewish Irène Némirovsky. The first print of 24,000 copies was sold out after only two days.

Exhibition
Opening of the exhibit "Hélène Berr, A Stolen Life - Exhibition from Mémorial de la Shoah, Paris France", was held at the Alliance Française d'Atlanta in Atlanta, Georgia USA, on Wednesday, 22 January 2014, at 7:00 PM. Speakers included the Consul Generals of France and Germany, Directors of the Alliance Française and the Goethe-Zentrum as well as the Executive Directors of the Memorial de la Shoah, Paris and the Georgia Commission on the Holocaust.

See also
 List of Holocaust diarists
 List of diarists
 List of posthumous publications of Holocaust victims
 Hana Brady - Jewish girl and Holocaust victim; subject of the children's book Hana's Suitcase
 Helga Deen - Dutch Jewish diarist; kept a diary in Herzogenbusch concentration camp (Camp Vught)
 Anne Frank - Jewish author of The Diary of a Young Girl
 Etty Hillesum - Dutch Jewish diarist and Holocaust victim; kept a diary in Amsterdam and in the  Westerbork concentration camp
 Etty Hillesum and the Flow of Presence: A Voegelinian Analysis
 Věra Kohnová - Czech Jewish diarist and Holocaust victim
 David Koker - wrote a diary in Herzogenbusch concentration camp (Camp Vught)
 Janet Langhart - writer of a one act play, Anne and Emmett 
 Rutka Laskier - Polish Jewish diarist and Holocaust victim
 Sam Pivnik - Polish Jewish Holocaust survivor, author and memoirist
 Rainer Maria Rilke - German poet who influenced her thoughts and diary writings.
 Tanya Savicheva - Russian girl who died of starvation in Leningrad who left a diary
 Sophie Scholl - German student executed by the Nazis
 Henio Zytomirski - Polish Jewish Holocaust victim

Selected works 
Hélène Berr: Hélène Berr Journal, 1942–1944, Foreword by Patrick Modiano, January 2008, Éditions Tallandier, 
Préface du «Journal» d'Hélène Berr, Foreword (French)
Hélène Berr: The Journal of Hélène Berr, Translated by David Bellos with notes by the translator and an afterword by Mariette Job, 2008, McClelland & Stewart, Toronto, 
Hélène Berr: Oorlogsdagboek 1942-1944, Translated by Marianne Kaas with a foreword by Patrick Modiano, 2009, De Geus, Breda,  (Dutch)

References

External links 
 Lise Jaillant, "A Masterpiece Ripped From Oblivion: Rediscovered Manuscripts and the Memory of the Holocaust in Contemporary France." , Clio 39.3 (Summer 2010): 359–79.
France finds its own Anne Frank as young Jewish woman's war diary hits the shelves The Observer, 6. January 2008 (English)
Helene Berr's Holocaust Diary Flies Off the Shelves Der Spiegel, 9 January 2008 (English)

1921 births
1945 deaths
French Jews who died in the Holocaust
University of Paris alumni
Writers from Paris
Women diarists
French people who died in Bergen-Belsen concentration camp
Auschwitz concentration camp prisoners
French women memoirists
20th-century French women writers
20th-century French writers
Jewish women writers
Holocaust diarists
French memoirists
20th-century memoirists